Francis B. Higgins House, also known as the Caldwell-Higgins House, is a historic home located at Newberry, Newberry County, South Carolina.  It was built about 1820, and is a two-story weatherboarded residence with Federal and Greek Revival style details. The front facade features a projecting central portico.   It was built by Francis B. Higgins, Newberry attorney, planter, and county commissioner in equity, and is the oldest documented dwelling in Newberry.

It was listed on the National Register of Historic Places in 1980.

References 

Houses on the National Register of Historic Places in South Carolina
Federal architecture in South Carolina
Greek Revival houses in South Carolina
Houses completed in 1820
Houses in Newberry County, South Carolina
National Register of Historic Places in Newberry County, South Carolina
Newberry, South Carolina